Ulrich, 10th Prince Kinsky of Wchinitz and Tettau (15 August 189319 December 1938) was the titular pretender Prince Kinsky of Wchinitz and Tettau.

Early life
Ulrich was born at Chotzen, Kingdom of Bohemia the eldest child of Count Ferdinand Vincent Kinsky von Wchinitz und Tettau (1866–1916) (sixth child of Ferdinand Bonaventura, 7th Prince Kinsky of Wchinitz and Tettau and Countess Wilhelmine of Colloredo-Mansfeld) and Princess Aglaë of Auersperg (1868–1919) (fourth child of Prince Adolf of Auersperg and Countess Johanna Festetics de Tolna).

Marriage and family
Ulrich married on 19 January 1918 in Budapest to Countess Katalin Széchényi de Sárvár-Felsövidek (1893–1968), youngest daughter of Count Imre Széchényi de Sárvár-Felsövidék, and his wife, Countess Maria Andrássy de Csik-Szent-Király et Kraszna-Horka. They divorced in 1930.

They had three children:
Count Ulrich Kinsky of Wchinitz and Tettau (9 December 1918 – 1929)
Countess Maria Kinsky of Wchinitz and Tettau (5 June 1924  – 14 February 1960), (1) married in 1945 to Margrave Friedrich Pallavicini, divorced in 1949; one son. (2) married in 1950 to Pier-Luigi Tagliaferri, divorced in 1959; no issue. (3) married in 1959 to Conte Alvise Sagramoso-Sacchetti; no issue.
Countess Charlotte Kinsky of Wchinitz and Tettau (born 18 November 1927), married in 1956 to Dimitri Borissovich Manakoff; no issue.

He married secondly on 10 March 1932 in Munich to Baroness Marie von dem Bussche-Haddenhausen (1900–1974), eldest daughter of Baron Hilmar von dem Bussche-Haddenhausen, and his wife Maria Eleonore Martinez de Hoz, first cousin twice removed of Argentina's Minister of Economy José Alfredo Martínez de Hoz.

They had three children:
Countess Eleonore Kinsky of Wchinitz and Tettau (22 November 1932 – 23 March 1983), married in 1961 to Carlos Enrique Daireaux; had issue.
Countess Aglaë Kinsky of Wchinitz and Tettau (born 22 November 1932)
Franz Ulrich, 11th Prince Kinsky of Wchinitz and Tettau (7 October 1936 – 2 April 2009), married in 1965 to Roberta Cavanagh; had issue.

Prince Kinsky
He became the titular pretender 10th Prince Kinsky of Wchinitz and Tettau at the death of his uncle Rudolf in 1930, his uncle died without male heir. At his death, the title was inherited by his only surviving son Franz Ulrich.

Ancestry

Notes and sources
Genealogisches Handbuch des Adels, Fürstliche Häuser, Reference: 1956

1893 births
1938 deaths
House of Kinsky
People from Choceň